James Robertson (1880 – after 1915) was a Scottish professional footballer who played as an inside right.

Born in Glasgow, Robertson moved to England to join Crewe Alexandra, who were then playing in the Birmingham & District League, where he made his name as a goal-poacher. He signed for Small Heath, newly promoted to the Football League First Division, in 1903 for a fee of £25, but failed to adapt to League football. Two years later, along with fellow Small Heath players Jimmy Windridge and Bob McRoberts, he moved to Chelsea, where he scored 21 goals in the club's first couple of seasons in the English Football League, as well as one in the FA Cup. Spells followed with Leyton, Partick Thistle, Ayr United, Barrow, Leeds City and Gateshead Town, before he retired in 1915.

References

1880 births
Footballers from Glasgow
Scottish footballers
Association football forwards
Crewe Alexandra F.C. players
Birmingham City F.C. players
Chelsea F.C. players
Glossop North End A.F.C. players
Leyton F.C. players
Partick Thistle F.C. players
Ayr United F.C. players
Barrow A.F.C. players
Leeds City F.C. players
Gateshead Town F.C. players
English Football League players
Year of death missing